Yurkovka is a rural locality (a village) in Dedovsky Selsoviet, Fyodorovsky District, Bashkortostan, Russia. The population was 176 as of 2010. There are 2 streets.

Geography 
Yurkovka is located 16 km southwest of Fyodorovka (the district's administrative centre) by road. Novaya Derevnya is the nearest rural locality.

References 

Rural localities in Fyodorovsky District